Welle:Erdball (often abbreviated as W:E) is a German band whose sound is distinguished by their intensive use of the Commodore 64's SID sound chip.

The band name literally means "Wave:Earthball" or "Wave:Globe" and is inspired by an almost eponymous Weimar republican radio play entitled "Hallo! Hier Welle Erdball!". The band's logo displays a rotated version of the Eastern German motor company VEB Sachsenring, the former producer the world-famous Trabant car.

Welle:Erdball have been part of the demoscene and produced several musicdisks as well as other formats over the years. They have also performed live at the Breakpoint 2006.

In addition to their work as Welle:Erdball, Honey had been involved in the project called "Das Präparat" from 2003 to 2005. Currently Honey (aka Dr. Georg Linde) and "Plastique" have launched new side-project called "homo~futura".

Members 
 Hannes "Honey" Malecki - lyrics, vocals (1990-)
 MissMoonlight - percussion, vocals (2019-)
 M.A. Peel - percussion, vocals (2019-)
 c0zmo - music, programming (2019-)

Former members 
 Isa - Vocals, Tones (1993-1995)
 Xenia G-punkt – Vocals, Percussion (1995-1999)
 KayCat – Percussion (2000–2002)
 Soraya.vc – Vocals, Percussion (2000–2004)
 Zara – Percussion (2004–2005)
 Fräulein Plastique - Vocals, percussion (2005-2013)
 Alf "A.L.F." Behnsen - music, programming (1990-2019)
 Fräulein Venus - percussion, vocals (2003-2019)
 Lady Lila - percussion, vocals (2013-2019)

Gallery

Discography

Albums 
 Der Sinn des Lebens (The meaning of life, 1992 as Honigmond)
 Es ist an der Zeit (It is about time, 1993)
 Frontalaufprall (Head-on impact, 1994)
 Alles ist möglich (Everything is possible, 1995)
 Tanzpalast 2000 (Dancing palace 2000, 1996)
 Der Sinn des Lebens (The meaning of life, 1998)
 Horizonterweiterungen (Expansion of the horizon, only Vinyl 12", 2004)
 Die Wunderwelt der Technik (The wonderworld of technology,CD 2002 / Vinyl 12", 2005)
 Chaos Total (CD 2006 / Picture-Vinyl 12", 2009)
 Cmdr. Laserstrahl (radio play, 2009)
 Operation: Zeitsturm (2010)
 Der Kalte Krieg (The Cold War, 2011)
 Tanzmusik für Roboter (Dance Music for Robots, 2014)
 Gaudeamus Igitur (2017)
 Film, Funk und Fernsehen (2022)

Singles and EPs 
 Nyntändo-Schock (Nyntändo-Shock, 1993)
 W.O.L.F. (1995)
 Telephon W-38 (1996)
 Deine Augen / Arbeit Adelt! (Your eyes / Work ennobles!, 1998)
 Starfighter F-104G (2000)
 VW-Käfer & 1000 Tage (VW Käfer and 1000 days, 2001)
 Super 8 (2001)
 Nur tote Frauen sind schön (Only dead women are beautiful, 2003)
 Ich bin aus Plastik – Vinyl (2008)
 Ich bin aus Plastik – CD (With extra tracks than Vinyl) (2008)
 Die Singles 1993–2010 – 10 cd box (2010)
 Computerklang (Computer Sound) (2013)
 Ich rette dich (I will save you) (2014)
 1000 Engel (1000 angels) (2015)

DVD 
 Operation: Zeitsturm Movie-DVD (2010)
 Der Kalte Krieg Live-DVD (2011)

Solo- or Sideprojects 
 The Screeching MiEW (1994, Honey and Xenia G.)
 1994: Awakening of the Animals (Cassette album, 2003 Re-release of song Speak for the Future on the W:E EP Nur tote Frauen sind schön)
 Das Präparat (2003 to 2005 Honey)
 2004: Tanz' mit Deinem Gefühl (MCD)
 homo~futura (2005, Honey [alias Dr. Georg Linde], Plastique, K. Gross und F. Enstein)
 2011: Der Neue Mensch
 The Girl & The Robot (2009, Plastique and Deadbeat)
 2010: The Beauty of Decay
 2011: Silence ⋆ Borderline (EP)
 Die Funkhausgruppe (Welle:Erdball, Die Perlen, Sonnenbrandt and Hertzinfarkt)
 2011: Mono-Poly

References

External links 

 Official Welle:Erdball page
 Welle:Erdball on Discogs
 Welle:Erdball on AllMusic
 Welle:Erdball on C 64 Scene Database (CSDb)
 Welle:Erdball on Pouët.net

Commodore 64 music
German synthpop groups
Musical groups established in 1990
1990 establishments in Germany